Too Cold at Home is the second studio album by American country music artist Mark Chesnutt, released in 1990 on MCA Records. Certified platinum by the RIAA for sales of one million copies, the album produced five Top Ten singles for Chesnutt on the Billboard Hot Country Songs charts. Chronologically, these singles were "Too Cold at Home" (#3), "Brother Jukebox" (#1), "Blame It on Texas" (#5), "Your Love Is a Miracle" (#3), and "Broken Promise Land" (#10). Two of these singles were previously recorded by other artists: "Broken Promise Land" by Waylon Jennings on his 1985 album Turn the Page and "Brother Jukebox" by Keith Whitley on his 1989 album I Wonder Do You Think of Me, and before that by Don Everly in 1977.

Also featured on this album is the song "Friends in Low Places", which was recorded by Garth Brooks on his 1990 album No Fences. Brooks's rendition of the song, released as a single in late 1990, spent four weeks at Number One that year, and has since become a country classic.

Track listing

Personnel

 Richard Bennett - electric guitar
 David Briggs - piano
 Jerry Carrigan - percussion
 Mark Chesnutt - lead vocals
 Glen Duncan - fiddle
 Pat Flynn - acoustic guitar
 Paul Franklin - steel guitar
 Owen Hale - drums
 Bill Kenner - reggae guitar
 Jana King - background vocals
 Phil Naish - synthesizer
 Steve Nathan - piano
 Mark O'Connor - fiddle
 Lynn Peterzell - percussion
 Hargus "Pig" Robbins - piano
 Matt Rollings - piano
 Brent Rowan - acoustic guitar, electric guitar
 Lisa Silver - background vocals
 Milton Sledge - drums
 Biff Watson - acoustic guitar
 Bergen White - background vocals
 Dennis Wilson - background vocals
 Glenn Worf - bass guitar
 Bob Wray - bass guitar
 Mark Wright - background vocals
 Curtis Young - background vocals

Charts

Weekly charts

Year-end charts

References

1990 albums
Mark Chesnutt albums
MCA Records albums
Albums produced by Mark Wright (record producer)